Sarah Louise Teather (born 1 June 1974) is the Director of Jesuit Refugee Service UK and  a former British Member of Parliament and Minister. As a Liberal Democrat politician, she founded the All-Party Parliamentary Group on Guantanamo Bay and was chairman of the All-Party Parliamentary Group on Refugees. On stepping down as an MP, she joined the Jesuit Refugee Service as an advocacy adviser and was appointed as country director of JRS UK in December 2015.

After serving in the Islington London Borough Council, she was first elected as an MP on 18 September 2003 at the Brent East by-election and was re-elected with an increased majority at the 2005 general election. After the seat was abolished due to boundary changes, Teather was selected as the Liberal Democrat candidate for the successor seat, Brent Central. Her main opponent was sitting Labour MP Dawn Butler, whose Brent South seat was also abolished. Teather won by a small margin, and, after the election, she served as Minister of State in the Department for Education in the coalition government between the Conservatives and the Liberal Democrats until she returned to the backbenches on 4 September 2012. On 7 September 2013, she announced that she would leave the House of Commons in 2015.

Early life
Teather was educated at the independent Leicester Grammar School and St John's College, Cambridge, where she gained a 2:1 degree in Natural Sciences specialising in pharmacology.

Teather initially embarked on a PhD at University College London, but left the course at the end of her first year. She went on to work as a policy adviser for a number of prominent groups including the Royal Society and the charity Macmillan Cancer Relief.

Teather first contested an election on 7 June 2001 in the seat of Finchley and Golders Green.  On 3 May 2002 she was elected to Islington London Borough Council as one of the three councillors representing Hillrise Ward. She was then appointed by the council to serve as a school governor at Ashmount Primary School.

Subsequent to her first election as an MP she resigned from Islington Council, resigned as a school governor at Ashmount Primary and withdrew as a candidate for the Greater London Assembly seat in North East London.

In Westminster and Whitehall

Member of Parliament
In 2003 Teather was selected as the party's candidate in the Brent East by-election, which was called after the death of the Labour MP Paul Daisley.

The by-election took place during the early stages of the Iraq War, which the Liberal Democrats strongly opposed under leader Charles Kennedy, and was a controversial involvement denting support for the Labour government. The Liberal Democrats came from third place behind Labour and the Conservatives, with a 39.12% share of the total and 1,118 majority. At 29, Teather became the youngest Member of Parliament, known as Baby of the House. The by-election was Labour's first by-election defeat in 15 years.

In her maiden speech when first elected as an MP in 2003, she spoke about her opposition to tuition fees:

She successfully defended her seat in the 2005 general election, increasing her majority to over 2,700. In May 2009, she was listed by The Daily Telegraph as one of the "Saints" in the expenses scandal. In Autumn 2006, she spent a week observing in schools, writing a daily blog of the experience for Guardian Unlimited.

On 31 August 2006, she announced her intention to stand for the new Brent Central constituency. In her campaign for re-election in May 2010, Teather reiterated her opposition to tuition fees, signing a pledge to vote against them. She defeated by 1,300 votes the Labour candidate Dawn Butler, who had been the MP for Brent South in the previous parliament, despite Butler having a notional 50.1%  share of the vote in the new constituency.

She established the All-Party Parliamentary Group on Guantanamo Bay in March 2007, and used the group to campaign against the detention without charge of Jamil el-Banna, a constituent. She visited Washington twice to lobby on his behalf, and also worked closely on the case with the anti-death penalty charity, Reprieve and Amnesty International.

Liberal Democrats Frontbench Team
In parliament Teather became one of the highest-profile Liberal Democrat MPs. Initially acting as her party's spokesperson on London, after the 2005 general election she was promoted to the front bench to serve as Liberal Democrat spokesperson on Community and Local Government.

On 6 January 2006, 25 Liberal Democrat MPs signed a letter drafted by Teather and fellow frontbencher Ed Davey, indicating their unwillingness to continue working under party leader Charles Kennedy. The Guardian claimed the letter to be "the most damning" of the publicly expressed sentiments regarding Kennedy's position, and later that day Kennedy announced his resignation. Teather supported Sir Menzies Campbell in the subsequent leadership election.

She was promoted again to Education spokesperson following Sir Menzies Campbell's election as leader on 2 March 2006. In 2007 Teather became Business spokesperson, followed by becoming Housing spokesperson from 2008.

Minister in the coalition government
Following the formation of the coalition government in May 2010 Teather became Minister of State for Children and Families.

In September 2010 The Sunday Times reported that she had been accused by several members of parliament of lobbying her boss, the Education Secretary Michael Gove, for two schools in her constituency to be spared from the government's plans to cancel refurbishment projects on over 700 schools nationwide.The plans for refurbishment of the two schools, which had been previously cancelled, was reinstated.

On 13 July 2011, Teather told the Family and Parenting Institute that she was extremely worried about the £26,000 Benefit Cap that the Coalition Government was introducing as part of the Welfare Reform Act 2012. Teather then failed to turn up to a number of key votes on the Welfare Reform Act despite there being a three-line whip, which resulted in a number of Conservative backbench MPs publicly calling for her to be sacked.

In April 2011, Teather was questioned on BBC Television's Question Time over replacing the Education Maintenance Allowance. Arguing against the claim that fewer poor pupils would be served by its replacement, Teather claimed that it would actually be targeted better at those who actually needed government support.

On 6 February 2012 Teather was part of a ministerial working group together with Tim Loughton and justice minister Jonathan Djanogly that was asked to come up with proposals within two months on how the law should be changed regarding how to amend the Children Act of 1989. According to The Guardian of 3 February 2012, that working group is aimed to include in the new Children Act one "presumption of shared parenting" for children's fathers and mothers after cases of divorce or spousal break-up.

On 4 September 2012, she was sacked from her post, as part of a broad government reshuffle, and returned to the backbenches.

Post-ministerial activities
After leaving Government, Teather gave an interview to The Observer newspaper, in which she called the Benefit Cap "immoral and divisive". She then voted against the coalition for the first time, on a deferred division on the final regulations needed to put the Benefit Cap in place. In late 2012, Teather chaired a Parliamentary inquiry into asylum support for children and young people, which was supported by The Children's Society.

In February 2013, Teather voted against the Marriage (Same Sex Couples) Bill at its second reading. She later expressed regret for this vote, writing that she has since "thanked God that I was then in an irrelevant minority".

On 7 September 2013, Teather released a statement through her website to announce she would not contest the 2015 general election, saying her decision was "to do with some aspects of government policy", adding that she "no longer feels that Nick Clegg's party fights sufficiently for social justice and liberal values on immigration".

On 3 March 2015, the All Party Parliamentary Group on Refugees and the All Party Parliamentary Group on Migration published a report on the use of immigration detention. The inquiry panel, chaired by Sarah Teather, found that "the UK uses detention disproportionately and inappropriately" and recommended that a time limit of 28 days be introduced as the maximum length of time an individual can be held in an immigration removal centre.

Later career
Teather stood down as the MP for Brent Central at the 2015 general election and joined the International Advocacy team of the Jesuit Refugee Service in June 2015. As an advocacy advisor, she visited JRS projects all over the world, including: Lebanon, South Sudan, Uganda, North Macedonia and the southern coast of Italy where thousands of migrants were attempting dangerous overseas crossings to mainland Europe across the Mediterranean Sea. On 3 December 2015, it was announced that Teather had been appointed as the country director of JRS UK.

Personal life
Teather is Catholic. At , she has been the shortest woman member of Parliament in British history.

See also
Liberal Democrat Frontbench Team

References

External links
Profile at the Liberal Democrats

Video: Sarah Teather speaks about parliamentary demographics hosted by YouTube on the BBC's official channel
Contributor page at The Guardian.

|-

|-

1974 births
Living people
People from Enfield, London
Liberal Democrats (UK) MPs for English constituencies
Alumni of St John's College, Cambridge
Alumni of University College London
British charity and campaign group workers
Female members of the Parliament of the United Kingdom for English constituencies
People educated at Leicester Grammar School
Politics of the London Borough of Brent
English Roman Catholics
UK MPs 2001–2005
UK MPs 2005–2010
UK MPs 2010–2015
Liberal Democrats (UK) councillors
Women councillors in England
21st-century British women politicians
21st-century English women
21st-century English people